Project Runway All Stars (season 7) is the seventh season of the Project Runway spin-off series Project Runway All Stars. The concept of the edition was Champions. It featured fourteen winning designers - seven being winners of the American version of Project Runway, and seven being winners of foreign versions of Project Runway. This was the last season of Project Runway to air on Lifetime. Alyssa Milano returned as host and both Georgina Chapman and Isaac Mizrahi likewise returned as judges, along with one to three guest judges each week. The show premiered on January 2, 2019 on Lifetime.

Judges
In addition to Alyssa Milano both Georgina Chapman and Isaac Mizrahi returned as judges for this season. The mentor for this season was Anne Fulenwider. Some of the celebrity guest judges for season 7 were Debra Messing, Vanessa Williams, Anna Camp, Andrew Rannells, Andrea Riseborough, Cynthia Erivo, Asia Kate Dillon, Wendy Williams, Tamron Hall, Danica Patrick, Disney stars Sofia Carson and Peyton List, designers Reem Acra and Rebecca Minkoff, fashion icon Iris Apfel, models Lily Aldridge, Olivia Culpo, Joan Smalls, Martha Hunt, Jasmine Tookes, Kiera Chaplin and Project Runway judge Nina Garcia.

Designers

Designer Progress 

  The designer won Project Runway All Stars: Season 7.
  The designer won the challenge.
  The designer came in second but did not win the challenge.
  The designer had one of the highest scores for that challenge, but did not win.
  The designer had one of the lowest scores for that challenge, but was not eliminated.
  The designer was in the bottom two, but was not eliminated.
  The designer lost and was eliminated from the competition.

Rate the Runway Results 

  The designer won Project Runway All Stars: Season 7.
  The designer won the challenge.
  The designer came in second but did not win the challenge.
  The designer had one of the highest scores for that challenge, but did not win.
  The designer had one of the lowest scores for that challenge, but was not eliminated.
  The designer was in the bottom two, but was not eliminated.
  The designer lost and was eliminated from the competition.

Episodes

Episode 1: All Stars Goes Global 
Original airdate: January 2, 2019

"Project Runway winners from the U.S. and around the world compete in the first-ever fashion world championship", and were challenged to create an original design to showcase the region they are from.
 Guest Judge: Debra Messing
 WINNER: Dmitry Sholokhov
 ELIMINATED: None
At the end of the episode, rather than an elimination, two more all-star designers were added to the cast: Sean Kelly (winner of U.S. Season 13) and Juli Grbac (the first winner of Project Runway Australia).

Episode 2: Top of the Class  
Original airdate: January 9, 2019

"Project Runway" winners worldwide designed sophisticated graduation party outfits; actress Sofia Carson joined the judges. 
 Guest Judges: Actresses Sofia Carson & Kiera Chaplin
 WINNER: Anthony Ryan Auld
 ELIMINATED: Sunny Fong

Episode 3: Buckle Up!   
Original airdate: January 16, 2019

Season winners faced the "Unconventional Materials Challenge " on board an airplane; Tamron Hall and Martha Hunt were guest judges.

 Guest Judges: Tamron Hall &  Martha Hunt 
 WINNER: Irina Shabayeva
 ELIMINATED: Seth Aaron Henderson

Episode 4: Of Corsets Fashion   
Original airdate: January 23, 2019

International All Stars created outerwear from underwear by transforming corsets into runway looks; Rebecca Minkoff and Olivia Culpo were guest judges.
 Guest Judges: Olivia Culpo & Rebecca Minkoff
 WINNER: Christina Exie
 ELIMINATED: Jasper Garvida

Episode 5: On The Prowl   
Original airdate: January 30, 2019

The all-winners season continued with high fashion inspired by zoo animals; Peyton List and Joan Smalls were guest judges. 

 Guest Judges: Model-actresses Peyton List & Joan Smalls
 WINNER: Michelle Lesniak
 ELIMINATED: Juli Grbac

Episode 6: Pedal To The Metal 
Original airdate: February 6, 2019

Guests Wendy Williams, Danica Patrick, and Lily Aldridge joined the judges for red carpet fashion using metallic fabrics and unique textures.

 Guest Judges: Wendy Williams, Danica Patrick & Lily Aldridge 
 WINNER: Sean Kelly
 ELIMINATED: Anya Ayoung-Chee

Episode 7: Pure Imagination   
Original airdate: February 13, 2019

Willy Wonka inspired the designers to create new inventions in fashion for an avant-garde runway; guest judges were Andrew Rannells and Anna Camp.

 Guest Judges: Andrew Rannells & Anna Camp 
 WINNER: Anthony Ryan Auld
 ELIMINATED: Django Steenbakker

Episode 8: Penneys From Heaven 
Original airdate: February 20, 2019

Vanessa Williams and Jasmine Tookes were guest judges as Project Runway winners turned daytime separates into a nighttime look.

 Guest Judge: Vanessa Williams & Jasmine Tookes
 WINNER: Evan Biddell
 ELIMINATED: Cynthia Hayashi

Episode 9: All-Inclusive   
Original airdate: February 27, 2019

Asia Kate Dillon joined the panel to judge gender-neutral streetwear that could be worn by anyone.

 Guest Judge: Asia Kate Dillon
 WINNER: Christina Exie
 ELIMINATED: Sean Kelly

Episode 10: Climate Quick Change   
Original airdate: March 6, 2019

The participants battled extreme weather on and off the runway for resort wear that transitioned from one climate into another; Cynthia Erivo and Reem Acra were guest judges.

 Guest Judge: Cynthia Erivo & Reem Acra
 WINNER: Michelle Lesniak
 ELIMINATED: Christina Exie

Episode 11: Nina Says Don't Cry Over Spilt Silk   
Original airdate: March 13, 2019

Nina Garcia challenged season winners to design modern ball gowns in luxurious silk; fashion icon Iris Apfel joined the judges.

 Guest Judge: Iris Apfel & Nina Garcia
 WINNER: Irina Shabayeva
 ELIMINATED: Anthony Ryan Auld

Episode 12: Modern Families    
Original airdate: March 20, 2019

The remaining participants created fashion for modern families to secure their place in the finale; Marie Claire's Editor-in-Chief Anne Fulenwider was guest judge.

 Guest Judge: Anne Fulenwider
 WINNER: Evan Biddell
 ELIMINATED: None

Episode 13: All the World's a Runway 
Original airdate: March 27, 2019

Actress Andrea Riseborough helped the judges crown a world champion as designers produced runway collections in front of New York's fashion elite. 
 Guest Judge: Andrea Riseborough
 WINNER: Michelle Lesniak
 ELIMINATED: Evan Biddell, Irina Shabayeva, & Dmitry Sholokhov

References

External links
 Project Runway All Stars Official Website
 

All Stars Season 07
2019 American television seasons